Lieutenant General Kunhiraman Palat Candeth, PVSM (Hindi: कुँहिरामन पलट कंडेथ; 23 October 1916 – 19 May 2003) was a senior army officer in the Indian Army who played a commanding role in Liberation of Goa from Portuguese control in 1961, and briefly tenured as the Military Governor of Goa, Daman and Diu.

He later served as the Deputy Chief of Army Staff based on GHQ in New Delhi at the midst of the second war in 1965, and later effectively commanded the Western Command during the third war with Pakistan in 1971.

Early life
He was born in Ottapalam, Malabar District (now Kerala) in British India (now India) to MA Candeth, being the grandson of the landlord and writer Vengayil Kunhiraman Nayanar. His maternal grandfather was Sir C. Sankaran Nair, who was the President of the Indian National Congress.

Military career

Pre-independence
Commissioned into the Royal Artillery in 1936, Candeth saw action in West Asia during the Second World War. And, shortly before India's independence from colonial rule, he was deployed in the North West Frontier Province, bordering Afghanistan, to quell local tribes. The mountainous terrain gave Candeth the experience for his later operations against Nagaland separatists in the North East. He attended the Military Services Staff College at Quetta, capital of Baluchistan in 1945.

Kashmir 1947
After Independence, Candeth was commanding an artillery regiment that was deployed to Jammu and Kashmir after Pakistan-backed tribesmen attacked and captured a third of the province before being forced back by the Indian Army. Thereafter, Candeth held a series of senior appointments, including that of Director General of Artillery at Army Headquarters in Delhi, to which he was appointed on 8 September 1959, with the acting rank of major-general (substantive colonel).

North East
After relinquishing charge as Goa's Military Governor in 1963, Candeth was appointed GOC, Nagaland on 23 August 1963. He took command of the newly raised 8 Mountain Division in the North-East on 15 November 1963, where he battled, although with little success, the highly organised Naga insurgents. The insurgency in the North East has not been quelled completely to this day. On 7 May 1965, he was appointed Deputy Chief of the Army Staff (DCOAS) with the acting rank of lieutenant-general. He was promoted to lieutenant-general on 17 January 1966, and was appointed GOC-in-C, Western Command on 27 September 1969.

Awards and later life
Lt. Gen. Kunhiraman Palat Candeth was awarded the Param Vishisht Seva Medal and also the Padma Bhushan by the Government of India. Retiring from the army on 21 October 1972, he joined the Bharatiya Janata Party (BJP) in the 1990s and was appointed a member of the Party's Executive Committee.

Dates of rank

See also
Operation Vijay
World War II
Vengayil Kunhiraman Nayanar

Notes

References

External links

https://web.archive.org/web/20060714020422/http://www.goavidhansabha.gov.in/pastgov.php

Candeth, K.P.
Candeth, K.P.
Indian generals
Generals of the Indo-Pakistani War of 1971
People from Ottapalam
History of Goa
Candeth, KP
Rashtriya Indian Military College alumni
Malayali people
Recipients of the Padma Bhushan in civil service
Recipients of the Param Vishisht Seva Medal